The 2016 Copa Sudamericana elimination stages were played from 9 August to 15 September 2016. A total of 46 teams competed in the elimination stages to decide 15 of the 16 places in the final stages of the 2016 Copa Sudamericana.

Draw

The draw of the tournament was held on 12 July 2016, 20:00 CLT (UTC−4), at the Espacio Riesco Convention and Events Center in Huechuraba, Chile.

For the first stage, the 32 teams were divided into two zones:
South Zone: The 16 teams from Bolivia, Chile, Paraguay, and Uruguay were drawn into eight ties.
North Zone: The 16 teams from Colombia, Ecuador, Peru, and Venezuela were drawn into eight ties.

Teams which qualified for berths 1 were drawn against teams which qualified for berths 4, and teams which qualified for berths 2 were drawn against teams which qualified for berths 3, with the former hosting the second leg in both cases. Teams from the same association could not be drawn into the same tie.
For the second stage, the 30 teams, including the 16 winners of the first stage (eight from South Zone, eight from North Zone), whose identity was not known at the time of the draw, and the 14 teams which entered the second stage, were divided into three sections:
Winners of the first stage: The 16 winners of the first stage were drawn into eight ties, with the order of legs decided by draw. Teams from the same association could be drawn into the same tie.
Brazil: The eight teams from Brazil were drawn into four ties. Teams which qualified for berths 1–4 were drawn against teams which qualified for berths 5–8, with the former hosting the second leg.
Argentina: The six teams from Argentina were drawn into three ties. Teams which qualified for berths 1–3 were drawn against teams which qualified for berths 4–6, with the former hosting the second leg.

Format

In the elimination stages (first stage and second stage), each tie was played on a home-and-away two-legged basis. If tied on aggregate, the away goals rule would be used. If still tied, extra time would not be played, and the penalty shoot-out would be used to determine the winner (Regulations Article 5.1). The 15 winners of the second stage (eight from winners of the first stage, four from Brazil, three from Argentina) advanced to the round of 16 to join the defending champions (Santa Fe).

First stage
The first legs were played on 9–11 August, and the second legs were played on 16–18 August 2016.

|-
!colspan=6|South Zone

|-
!colspan=6|North Zone

|}

Match G1

Cerro Porteño won 2–1 on aggregate and advanced to the second stage (Match O8).

Match G2

Tied 1–1 on aggregate, Sportivo Luqueño won on away goals and advanced to the second stage (Match O16).

Match G3

Bolívar won 3–2 on aggregate and advanced to the second stage (Match O4).

Match G4

Real Potosí won 4–2 on aggregate and advanced to the second stage (Match O8).

Match G5

Tied 1–1 on aggregate, Blooming won on penalties and advanced to the second stage (Match O6).

Match G6

Tied 2–2 on aggregate, Sol de América won on penalties and advanced to the second stage (Match O13).

Match G7

Tied 0–0 on aggregate, Montevideo Wanderers won on penalties and advanced to the second stage (Match O11).

Match G8

Palestino won 4–0 on aggregate and advanced to the second stage (Match O10).

Match G9

Emelec won 6–1 on aggregate and advanced to the second stage (Match O2).

Match G10

Tied 2–2 on aggregate, Real Garcilaso won on away goals and advanced to the second stage (Match O10).

Match G11

Junior won 5–2 on aggregate and advanced to the second stage (Match O6).

Match G12

Deportivo La Guaira won 1–0 on aggregate and advanced to the second stage (Match O2).

Match G13

Tied 2–2 on aggregate, Zamora won on penalties and advanced to the second stage (Match O11).

Match G14

Independiente Medellín won 2–1 on aggregate and advanced to the second stage (Match O16).

Match G15

Tied 2–2 on aggregate, Sport Huancayo won on away goals and advanced to the second stage (Match O13).

Match G16

Atlético Nacional won 6–0 on aggregate and advanced to the second stage (Match O4).

Second stage
The first legs were played on 23–25 August, and the second legs were played on 31 August and 13–15 September 2016.

|}

Match O1

Santa Cruz won 1–0 on aggregate and advanced to the round of 16 (Match A).

Match O2

Deportivo La Guaira won 4–2 on aggregate and advanced to the round of 16 (Match B).

Match O3

Chapecoense won 3–2 on aggregate and advanced to the round of 16 (Match C).

Match O4

Atlético Nacional won 2–1 on aggregate and advanced to the round of 16 (Match D).

Match O5

Belgrano won 2–1 on aggregate and advanced to the round of 16 (Match E).

Match O6

Junior won 3–1 on aggregate and advanced to the round of 16 (Match F).

Match O7

Tied 5–5 on aggregate, Flamengo won on away goals and advanced to the round of 16 (Match G).

Match O8

Cerro Porteño won 7–0 on aggregate and advanced to the round of 16 (Match H).

Match O10

Palestino won 3–2 on aggregate and advanced to the round of 16 (Match G).

Match O11

Montevideo Wanderers won 2–0 on aggregate and advanced to the round of 16 (Match F).

Match O12

Tied 2–2 on aggregate, Coritiba won on away goals and advanced to the round of 16 (Match E).

Match O13

Sol de América won 2–1 on aggregate and advanced to the round of 16 (Match D).

Match O14

Independiente won 3–0 on aggregate and advanced to the round of 16 (Match C).

Match O15

San Lorenzo won 4–3 on aggregate and advanced to the round of 16 (Match B).

Match O16

Independiente Medellín won 3–2 on aggregate and advanced to the round of 16 (Match A).

Notes

References

External links
Copa Sudamericana 2016, CONMEBOL.com 

1